Persiaran Mokhtar Dahari, or Shah Alam–Batu Arang Highway or Puncak Alam Highway and Jalan Batu Arang (Selangor state route B49), is a major highway in Selangor, Malaysia.

Overview
The Shah Alam–Batu Arang Highway runs for 17.2 kilometers into the north-western direction from Jalan Subang–Batu Tiga (also known as Jalan Sungai Buloh-Guthrie Corridor Expressway interchange) (Federal Route 3214) towards Jalan Meru Tambahan.

The midsection of this stretch at the 8th kilometre connects to Jalan Paip which allows a shorter route to the town of Meru and Klang.  The opposite end of this midsection intersection would reveal an access road leading to the entrance of the Subang Lake Dam, a major water catchment/reservoir for Subang and the surrounding vicinity.  This particular access road is also the location of a high-profile case involving the murder of a Mongolian model Altantuya Shariibuu.

Starting as a common two-way traffic trunk road, its condition had since been improved with the addition of more lighting, overtaking lanes and extra road shoulders to cater for slower traffic and motorcyclists.  Travellers will find that this particular road cuts through terrain that pass over undulating hill crests and green areas that used to be a forest reserve of Bukit Cherakah.  Drivers could see warning sign erected cautioning traffic of crossing tapirs (tenuk) that once lived in the forest areas. Similar precaution should also be exercised to give way to macaques (monkeys) that commonly scavenge along, and cross this particular road. Road accidents involving these precious wildlife had previously been reported, despite precautionary measures and relocation activities by the authorities.

Motorists should expect heavy traffic volume or bumper to bumper congestion heading towards Guthrie Corridor Expressway from 6.00 a.m. up to 9.00 a.m on workdays, and similar traffic pattern towards Puncak Alam beginning from 4.30 p.m up to 8.00 p.m.  The traffic flow would be adversely affected by a mere drizzle of the rain, vehicle breakdown, or any type of traffic accident.

Route background
The Kilometre Zero of the highway starts at Subang-Bukit Jelutong junctions.

History
The Shah Alam–Batu Arang Highway was built by a joint venture between Oxford Alliance Sdn. Bhd. and the Selangor state government to cater for the needs of a better access to the new township of Puncak Alam. However, the construction of the second phase of the road was delayed for two years due to the effect of the 1997 Asian financial crisis before being resumed in 1999. The highway was opened to motorists on 28 February 2003.

On 2014, the highway was renamed as Persiaran Mokhtar Dahari in honour of legendary Malaysian footballer Mokhtar Dahari.

Features

Unique features and place of interest
One stretch of this road cuts across a lake within the vicinity of Puncak Perdana, virtually cutting the lake into two sections by the road landfill.  This scenic spot is frequently visited  by  anglers due to its easy accessibility.

The green areas leading to and around the Subang Lake Dam, and also other roadside tracks along this highway also appears to be a popular trekking and mountain biking spot.

At most sections, the Federal Route B49 was built under the JKR R5 road standard, allowing maximum speed limit of up to 90 km/h.

List of junctions

References

External links
 Google map of Puncak Alam Highway
 Relocating Endangered Tapir, by Elizabeth John & K.T. Chelvi, New Straits Times

Highways in Malaysia
Roads in Selangor